Microstays are residency periods in a hotel room of less than a full night stay, choosing the check-in time and length of the stay in hours. Although such short stays have not been commonly offered by mainstream hotels in the Western hospitality industry, doing so emerged as a trend in the World Travel Market Global Trends Report 2013. Bookings for less than a full night stay became more popular in Europe as a way to increase revenue by offering greater flexibility. By offering microstays, hotels can take advantage of their available inventory and sometimes sell the same room twice in a day.

See also
Stayr and Getstayr.com – Hotel & Workspace bookings by the hour!
ByHours and Dayuse.com – Two microstay booking services
Day room (hotel) – Hotel bookings for brief stays especially for daytime use or layovers near airports and cruise ship ports
Love hotel – Hotels catering to microstay clients for sexual encounters

References

Hotel terminology
Tourist accommodations